I. spinosa may refer to:
 Iliella spinosa, an extinct branchiopod crustacean species
 Indigofera spinosa, a flowering plant species in the genus Indigofera

See also
 Spinosa (disambiguation)